The Somali Youth Coalition (SYC) is a community reach organization based in Toronto, Ontario, Canada. It was formed in 2001 when representatives from several child-youth service organizations united to identify and address the needs of and challenges facing the city's Somali youth.

Projects
In 2003, the Trillium Foundation of Ontario approved an SYC grant to establish the Somali Youth Support Project. The project’s goals include keeping youth in school, involving them in community, social, recreational, sporting and educational activities, encouraging volunteerism, and promoting youth leadership within the Somali community.

That same year, the SYC initiated two youth support programs: the Gang Prevention program and the Youth Support Services project. The Gang Prevention project is aimed at young Somalis in the Rexdale area of Toronto with the goal of working in conjunction with the Somali community, Somali parents, and Canadian public systems such as Education, Parks & Recreation, Child Welfare, and Criminal Justice to provide educational and preventative services to the local Somali youth and their parents. The Somali Youth Support program, for its part, works with the Somali community as well as mainstream institutions to reduce the risk factors that might cause Somali youth to drop out of school, join gangs and run into trouble with the law. The Project's strategy is to adopt an early prevention approach by promoting staying in school, getting involved in community recreation and sporting events, and developing young leaders who can serve as role models for other Somali youth.

Somali Youth Recognition Awards 
Under the umbrella of the Somali Youth Coalition, the Somali Youth Association of Toronto (SOYAT), Midaynta (a settlement and family services organization) and the Children's Aid Society of Toronto established in 2004 the Somali Youth Recognition Awards (SYRA), a ceremony that recognizes the significant achievements of and contributions to the Somali community by individual Somali youngsters. The SYRA also gives the Somali community a chance to show ownership and pride in its young people.

In order to win the award, nominees must meet a series of demanding general and award-specific criteria such as maintaining a minimum grade point average, managing or owning a business, setting a good example for other Somali youth, getting involved with the community and volunteering on a regular basis, among other things. Nine young men and nine young women are then selected to be recognized for outstanding achievement in a specific category.

Basic eligibility requirements

 A candidate must be of Somali descent
 He or she must be a resident of the Greater Toronto Area (GTA)
 He or she must be between the ages of 14-29
 Previous winners cannot win for the same category

Award categories

 Academic Achievement Award
 Entrepreneurship Achievements Award
 Successful Career Achievement Award
 Sports/ Athletics Achievement Award
 Community Work Achievement Award
 Music / Arts Achievement Award
 Spiritual Achievement Award
 Leadership Award

See also
 Yasmin Warsame

References
 Somali Youth Recognition Awards
 Somali youth recognized at special awards ceremony
 Association of Somali Service Agencies - 2003 Annual Report: Building a Better & Prosperous Community

Somali Canadian
Youth organizations based in Canada
Youth-led organizations